Local elections were held in Baguio on Monday, May 9, 2016, as a part of the 2016 Philippine general election. Voters elected candidates for the local elective posts in the city: the mayor, vice mayor, the congressman, and the twelve councilors

Incumbent city mayor Mauricio Domogan ran and won the mayoralty seat for a third and final term in office. Incumbent vice mayor Edison Bilog also ran for a full term and won, after assuming the post following then-vice mayor Daniel Farinas' death.

Mayoral and Vice Mayoral elections

Mayor 
Incumbent mayor Mauricio Domogan is running for a third and final term.

Vice Mayor 
Vice Mayor Edison Bilog is running for a full term as vice mayor, after assuming the post in 2014 following the death of then-vice mayor Daniel Farinas.

District representative 
Incumbent Representative Nicasio Aliping Jr. is running for a second term. He was defeated by businessman Mark Go.

City Council 
The 12 of 14 members of the Baguio City Council are elected at-large via multiple non-transferable vote, where each voter has 12 votes, and can vote up to 12 candidates. The 12 candidates with the highest number of votes are elected.

The other 2 members are elected in indirect elections from the results of barangay elections.Here is a list of candidates

|-bgcolor=black
|colspan=5|

References 

2016 Philippine local elections
Elections in Benguet
Elections in Baguio